Johan Eklund (born 18 February 1964) is a Swedish former handball player who competed in the 1988 Summer Olympics.

References

1964 births
Living people
Swedish male handball players
Olympic handball players of Sweden
Handball players at the 1988 Summer Olympics